The VII Iowa Piano Competition took place in Sioux City, Iowa, on March 7, 8 and 9th, 2013. Originally started as an annual event in 2005, the Iowa Piano Competition is, since 2011, held every two years. Competitors range in age from 18 to 35 years old. Applications from all over the world were submitted by the competitors (CD recording of their playing) and judged by a preliminary judging panel. 12 pianists were selected (as were 7 alternates), and were invited for the three live stages at Sioux City's famed Orpheum Theatre. The first round consisted of a solo recital. The second round consisted of a chamber music performance with members of the Rawlins Piano Trio, violinist Eunho Kim and cellist Marie-Elaine Gagnon. The final round consisted of a performance of a Beethoven concerto with the Sioux City Symphony Orchestra, conducted by Ryan Haskins. The competition awarded a total of $14,000  in prize money.

Jury
  Douglas Humpherys
  Marian Hahn
  Arthur Greene

PRIZES
 FIRST PRIZE ------  Wayne Weng
 SECOND PRIZE -------------  Josu De Solaun Soto
 THIRD PRIZE ----------------  Julia Siciliano
 Fourth prize -------  Shen Lu            
 Fifth prize -----------------------  Jee In Hwang
 Sixth prize -----------------------  Emily Chiang

Competition Results (by Rounds)

First Round (Solo Round)
  Moye Chen
  Emily Chiang
  Hui Shan Chin
  Jennifer Chu
  Josu De Solaun Soto
  Maxwell Foster
  Jee In Hwang
  Hanchien Lee
  Lu Shen
  Julia Siciliano
  Wayne Weng
  Xixi Zhou

Second Round (Chamber Music Round)
  Emily Chiang
  Josu de Solaun Soto
  Jee In Hwang
  Lu Shen
  Julia Siciliano
  Wayne Weng

Trio performances with Rawlins Trio members Eunho Kim, violinist and Marie-Elaine Gagnon, cellist

Final Round (Concerto Round)
  Wayne Weng --- Ludwig van Beethoven: Concerto for piano and orchestra nº5
  Josu de Solaun Soto --- Ludwig van Beethoven: Concerto for piano and orchestra nº3
  Julia Siciliano --- Ludwig van Beethoven: Concerto for piano and orchestra nº4

See also
Sioux City Symphony Orchestra. Ryan Haskins, conductor.

References

Piano competitions in the United States
March 2013 events in the United States
2013 in Iowa
2013 in American music
Sioux City, Iowa